Wesley Clarke is a New Zealand rugby union coach. He is currently the assistant coach of the New Zealand women's national rugby union team, and is also the Hurricanes Poua Head Coach.

Biography 
Clarke was born in Port Elizabeth, South Africa. He moved to Auckland to play rugby but concussions ended his playing career. He was the assistant coach of Manawatu from 2010 to 2013. In 2021 he was appointed as the Hurricanes Poua Head Coach ahead of the inaugural season of Super Rugby Aupiki.

Clarke is married to Former Black Fern Farah Palmer.

References 

Living people
New Zealand rugby union coaches
Year of birth missing (living people)